Michalková is a village and municipality of the Zvolen District in the Banská Bystrica Region of Slovakia.

External links
 

Villages and municipalities in Zvolen District